Kovilur may refer to places in India:

 Kovilur, Thanjavur, Tamil Nadu
 Kovilur, Ariyalur, Tamil Nadu
 Kovilur, Tiruvannamalai, Tamil Nadu
 Kovilur, Dharamapuri, Tamil Nadu